Sharon Stewart may refer to:
 Sharon Stewart (politician), New Zealand local politician in Auckland 
 Sharon Stewart (athlete) (born 1965), Australian middle-distance runner